This is a list of Zimbabwean provinces by Human Development Index as of 2021.

References

Zimbabwe
Human Development Index
Provinces by Human Development Index
HDI
Human Development Index